(Eng: Our Homeland) was a popular song in the German Democratic Republic, where it was sung by the Ernst Thälmann Pioneer Organisation.  The lyrics were written by Herbert Keller and the melody by Hans Naumilkat.  The song demonstrates strong bonds with nature, expressing the significance of a sense of homeland (heimat) beyond people.

The song plays an important role in the 2003 film Good Bye, Lenin!, being sung several times by Young Pioneer groups.

Lyrics

References

East German music
Pioneer movement
German songs
German patriotic songs